Mohammad Naderi (born October 5, 1996) is an Iranian footballer who plays as a defender for Altay in the 1. Lig.

Club career

K.V. Kortrijk 
In 2018, he left tractor manufacturing and left for Europe. He chose Kortrijk and joined the team on a four-year contract. From this team, he played on loan for two years for Perspolis Football Club

Esteghlal 
He joined Esteghlal Tehran Football Club in November 2020 with a one-year contract. He did not appear successful early in his tenure under Mahmoud Fekri and was criticized by the fans, but after his dismissal and the selection of Farhad Majidi as the new head coach, he returned to his heyday. He was able to assist in the game against Peykan in the Hazfi Cup. The next game against Mashin Sazi, he scored his first goal with for Esteghlal. After that, he scored in two consecutive games in the AFC Champions League against Al-AhlI of Saudi Arabia and Al-Shorta of Iraq, and gained more popularity among Esteghlal fans.

Altay 
On 13 August 2021, Naderi officially joined Turkish outfit Altay. He debuted for the club just a day later, playing against Kayserispor in a 3–0 win.

Club career statistics

International career

He made his debut against Iraq on 14 November 2019 in the World Cup qualification.

Honours 
 Tractor
 Hazfi Cup Runner-up: 2016–17

 Persepolis
 Persian Gulf Pro League (2): 2018–19, 2019–20
Hazfi Cup (1): 2018–19
Iranian Super Cup (1):  2019

 Esteghlal
 Hazfi Cup Runner-up: 2020–21

References

External links

Mohammad Naderi at eurosport.com

1996 births
Living people
People from Tehran
Iranian footballers
Iran international footballers
Iranian expatriate footballers
Tractor S.C. players
Nassaji Mazandaran players
K.V. Kortrijk players
Persepolis F.C. players
Esteghlal F.C. players
Persian Gulf Pro League players
Azadegan League players
Belgian Pro League players
Expatriate footballers in Belgium
Association football defenders
Iranian expatriate sportspeople in Belgium